Christian Javier Trapasso (June 1, 1970 in Buenos Aires, Argentina – October 3, 2007 in Buenos Aires, Argentina) was a former Argentine footballer who played for clubs of Argentina, Chile and Mexico.

Teams
  Argentinos Juniors 1989−1992
  Atlante 1993−1994
  Pachuca 1994−1995
  Toros Neza 1995−1996
  Deportes Concepción 1997
  Pachuca 1997−1998
  Atlético San Francisco 1998−1999

External links
 Profile at BDFA

1970 births
2007 deaths
Argentine footballers
Argentine expatriate footballers
Argentinos Juniors footballers
C.F. Pachuca players
Atlante F.C. footballers
Toros Neza footballers
San Luis F.C. players
Deportes Concepción (Chile) footballers
Chilean Primera División players
Argentine Primera División players
Expatriate footballers in Chile
Expatriate footballers in Mexico
Association footballers not categorized by position
Footballers from Buenos Aires